Pseudoxanthobacter  is a genus of Gram-negative, rod-shaped, aerobic and  nitrogen-fixing bacteria from the family Pseudoxanthobacteraceae.

References

Further reading 
 

Hyphomicrobiales
Bacteria genera